TV1 (formerly Bell Local and Community One) is a group of community channels operated by Bell Canada's Fibe TV and FibreOP TV services and are exclusive to those services.

The service is primarily delivered via video on demand.

History 
Bell Local channels operated in four cities in Bell's Fibe TV service area; they were renamed TV1 on August 31, 2015.

Bell Aliant simultaneously operated a single Community One channel serving all of Atlantic Canada, prior to its full acquisition by (and integration into) Bell Canada in 2014. In 2015, Bell Aliant acquired broadcast rights to Atlantic University Sport for broadcast on Community One. Community One was also renamed TV1 in September 2015.

In 2019, as part of license renewals, the CRTC began to scrutinize TV1 for producing non-access programming that was commercial in nature and not relevant to local communities. Specifically, the CRTC showed concerns over non-access programming tied to groups financially supported by Bell (such as the Festival d'été de Québec and Montreal Canadiens), and programming related to Bell Media properties (such as companions for The Amazing Race Canada, Cardinal, and eTalk) or starring personalities from local Bell Media radio and television stations. Bell defended the programs, arguing that they only constituted 5% of their output, were produced independently and "intimately tied to our various licence areas", and that they were designed to be associated with "popular" brands to attract viewership.

In recent years the channel has also invested in some scripted comedy and drama programming by independent local producers, including the series Pink Is In, Vollies, Sunshine City and Stittsville on Patrol.

List of channels 
Quebec City (French)
Trois-Rivières (French)
Joliette (French)
Gatineau (French)
Sherbrooke (French)
Ottawa (French/English)
Atlantic Canada (English/French)
Hamilton and Niagara Region (English)
London (English)
Kitchener (English)
Oshawa (English)
Kingston (English)

See also
 Rogers TV
 TV Rogers

References

External links 
 

Bell Canada
Canadian community channels
Television channels and stations established in 2015